Dalmatovo is a town and the administrative center of Dalmatovsky District in Kurgan Oblast, Russia, located east of the Ural Mountains on the north bank of the Iset River (Tobol's tributary; Ob's basin), opposite the mouth of the Techa River,  northwest of Kurgan, the administrative center of the oblast. Population:  It was previously known as Dalmatovskoye.

History
It was founded in 1644 as a sloboda next to the Dalmat Assumption Monastery, founded by a monk named Dalmat (hence, the name). Later on, this sloboda became a settlement of Dalmatovskoye. Dalmatovo is known to have been one of the first centers of orthodoxy, literacy, and Russian culture in the Trans-Ural region in the early 18th century. It was also a place of exile for some of the Old Believers. In 1781, Dalmatovo was granted town status but then downgraded back to rural status in 1797. In the 19th century, Dalmatovo was known as a major center of cucumber cultivation and hop picking. In 1947, it was granted towns status once again.

Administrative and municipal status
Within the framework of administrative divisions, Dalmatovo serves as the administrative center of Dalmatovsky District. As an administrative division, it is, together with three rural localities, incorporated within Dalmatovsky District as Dalmatovo Town Under District Jurisdiction. As a municipal division, Dalmatovo Town Under District Jurisdiction is incorporated within Dalmatovsky Municipal District as Dalmatovo Urban Settlement.

References

Notes

Sources

External links
Official website of Dalmatovo 
Dalmatovo Business Directory 

Cities and towns in Kurgan Oblast
Shadrinsky Uyezd
Populated places established in 1644